Georgi Evgen'evich Shilov (3 February 1917 – 17 January 1975) was a Soviet mathematician and expert in the field of functional analysis, who contributed to the theory of normed rings and generalized functions.

He was born in Ivanovo-Voznesensk.  After graduating from Moscow State University in 1938, he served in the army during World War II. He earned a doctorate in physical-mathematical sciences in 1951, also at MSU, and briefly taught at Kyiv University until returning as a professor at MSU in 1954. There, he supervised over 40 graduate students, including Mikhail Agranovich, Valentina Borok, Gregory Eskin, and Arkadi Nemirovski. Shilov often collaborated with colleague Israel Gelfand on research that included generalized functions and partial differential equations.

References
 Biography

Notes

External links
 
 List of publications

1917 births
1975 deaths
20th-century Russian mathematicians
Soviet mathematicians
Functional analysts